Bolin Chetia is a Bharatiya Janata Party politician from Assam. He has been elected in Assam Legislative Assembly election in 2006, 2011 and 2016 from Sadiya constituency. He belongs to the Buruk clan of the Chutia community and hails from Hatijan of Barekuri, Tinsukia.

Previously, he was member of Indian National Congress from Sadiya constituency in 2006 and 2011.

References 

Living people
Bharatiya Janata Party politicians from Assam
Assam MLAs 2006–2011
Assam MLAs 2011–2016
Assam MLAs 2016–2021
People from Tinsukia district
Indian National Congress politicians
Year of birth missing (living people)
Assam MLAs 2021–2026
Indian National Congress politicians from Assam